Florek is a Polish-language surname. Notable people with the surname include:

Dann Florek (born 1950), American actor and director
Justin Florek (born 1990), American ice hockey player

See also

Polish-language surnames